Tomasz Łosowski (born September 28, 1973), also known as Łosiu is a Polish jazz and session drummer. He played with such musicians and bands like The Blenders, ΠR2, Kombi, Marek Raduli, Wojtek Pilichowski, Robert Janson, Renata Dąbkowska, Leszek Możdżer and Marek Biliński.

Selected discography
Kombi / Łosowski
Koncert 15-lecia (1993, AGM Production)
Nowe narodziny (1995, X-Serwis)
Zaczarowane miasto (2009, MTJ)
Live (2013, MTJ)
Nowy album (2016, Fonografika)

Wojtek Pilichowski
Granat (1996, Poly Gram Polska)
Pi (2001, Pomaton EMI)

Leszek Możdżer
Pub 700 (2004, Fonografika)

Orange Trane
Obertas (1997, Polonia Records)
My personal Friend (1998, Npt two)

External links
 Official website

1973 births
Jazz drummers
Living people
21st-century drummers